Nahal Tavor (Wadi al-Bireh), lit. Tabor Stream, is an intermittent stream in the Lower Galilee, Israel.

Geography

The stream starts in the hills of Nazareth, east of the city, and runs east and south of Mount Tabor, where it turns east and then empties into the Jordan River between Gesher and Belvoir Fortress.

Three springs feed the stream within the boundaries of the Nahal Tavor Nature Reserve: Ein Rechesh, Ein Ze'ev, and Ein Shachal.

Near Kibbutz Gazit, the stream runs through a basalt canyon.

Nature reserve
The Tabor Stream received nature reserve status in 1974.

The nature reserve encompasses the stream from the area near Kfar Kish up to Highway 90.

Flora includes Tamarix, Willow, Ziziphus spina-christi, Pistacia atlantica, Faidherbia albida, and Prunus korshinskyi trees. Many wildflowers grow during the winter months, such as Lupins (Lupinus pilosus), Cyclamen persicum, Anemones, Chives, and Asafoetida.

Fauna in the reserve includes gazelles (Gazella gazella gazella), Spanish sparrows and Alectoris partridges.

References

Rivers of Israel
Nature reserves in Israel
Tributaries of the Jordan River